Omar Khailoti (born 5 September 2001) is a professional footballer who plays as a defender for  club Novara. Born in Italy, he is a youth international for Morocco.

Club career

Bologna
Grew up in the Bologna youth system, he made Serie A debut on 5 December 2020 in a away 3–1 loss against Inter.

Loan to Carrarese
On 31 August 2021, he joined Carrarese on loan.

Novara
On 14 July 2022, Khailoti signed a three-year contract with Novara.

International career
In November 2020, he was called up by Morocco national under-20 football team for a stage. As he did not yet debuted in official matches, he remain available for selection for both Morocco and Italy.

Statistics

Club

References

2001 births
Living people
People from Macerata
Moroccan footballers
Morocco youth international footballers
Italian footballers
Italian people of Moroccan descent
Italian sportspeople of African descent
Association football defenders
Serie A players
Serie C players
Bologna F.C. 1909 players
Carrarese Calcio players
Novara F.C. players
Footballers from Marche
Sportspeople from the Province of Macerata